Menzies Government may refer to:

Menzies government (1939–1941)
Menzies government (1949–1966)